Zarathos is a fictional character appearing in American comic books published by Marvel Comics. He is usually depicted in stories featuring the character known as the Ghost Rider. A demonic being who tortures and devours souls, Zarathos first appeared in Marvel Spotlight #5 (August 1972) and was created by writers Roy Thomas and Gary Friedrich and artist Mike Ploog.

Publication history

He first appears in Marvel Spotlight #5 (August 1972). He was created by writers Roy Thomas and Gary Friedrich and artist Mike Ploog.

Fictional character biography
As explained in Ghost Rider (vol. 2) #77, the physical stone body of the demon Zarathos had lain inert and inanimate beneath the Earth for eons until his spirit was summoned by a Native American tribal sorcerer named K'Nutu to help his tribe. Zarathos was then offered a steady supply of souls to consume in exchange for his aid in vanquishing enemies of the sorcerer's tribe and for offering his might in their service. This alliance proves mutually beneficial and flourishes. A strong cult builds up around Zarathos, which gets the attention of Mephisto, who decides that Zarathos has too much of a following and is depriving him and the other Lords of Hell of souls. Mephisto eventually confronts Zarathos and defeats him (by the deceptive use of his soulless pawn, Centurious).

Zarathos is then forced to serve Mephisto for many centuries in the Netherworld, an extra-dimensional land of the dead sometimes called "Hell", though still powerful enough to avoid total confinement. Mephisto sends his unruly vassal back to Earth on occasion, binding him to human hosts and allowing him to ravage souls (albeit on a smaller scale). In modern times, Zarathos is bound to Johnny Blaze; the combined Blaze/Zarathos entity manifests as a leather-clad flaming skeletal wraith known as the Ghost Rider, ultimately serving the side of "good" while still using hellish means, which earns the Ghost Rider a reputation of fear and Johnny Blaze a never-ending sense of guilt. As time progresses, Zarathos would occasionally from time to time reassert his control over Johnny Blaze's and his composite form.  Zarathos was temporarily separated from Johnny Blaze by the Crimson Mage. Zarathos gained additional control over the Ghost Rider, becoming more violent. As the Ghost Rider, he re-encountered Centurious. Johnny Blaze had grown stronger, causing an eventual clash over Blaze's physical body, as Mephisto temporarily frees Zarathos to compete with Johnny Blaze for his freedom. Before it can reach that point, Centurious (Mephisto's champion who defeated Zarathos thousands of years before) returns and has his pawn the Sin-Eater use his Soul Crystal to suck Blaze's soul from his body. This greatly weakens Zarathos who, without Blaze's soul, finds himself dying, for as a demon, and thus truly not of the Earth as mortals are, Zarathos cannot maintain himself upon the Earthly plane unless he possesses the physical body of a mortal. Using the last of his strength, Zarathos splits the crystal in half, freeing not only Blaze's soul, but innumerable souls that had been consumed by it in the past. Before the crystal merges back into one piece, it sucks Centurious inside as well. Zarathos feels cheated out of his revenge against Centurious, but with the help of the now-dying Sin-Eater, the demon manages to transfer his essence into the crystal. Johnny Blaze is now free from the curse that Mephisto placed on him many years before and the first existence of the Ghost Rider comes to an end.

Near the climax of the events of Secret Wars II, the Beyonder, angered at humanity and the entire plane of existence, travels to Hell and informs Mephisto of his plan to erase all existence contained in this universe. Mephisto pleads with the Beyonder not to commit such an act, going so far as to make a bet with him. The Beyonder agrees, under these terms: he chooses both a champion to represent him and a separate champion to represent Mephisto; if Mephisto wins, the universe will be given a 24-hour reprieve from destruction, but if the Beyonder wins, not only will he erase the universe from existence, he will give his champion ample time to exact revenge on Mephisto himself. The Beyonder chooses Spider-Man as Mephisto's champion and decides that Zarathos will be his own champion. Zarathos' goal is not only to corrupt Spider-Man's spirit and morals, but to prevent Spider-Man from stopping an assassination attempt on the Kingpin. Spider-Man overcomes Zarathos' nightmarish attempts at corrupting him and saves the Kingpin's life; thus, the Beyonder (after re-imprisoning Zarathos inside the Soul Crystal) allows the universe one more day to exist (during that additional day came the Beyonder's defeat and seeming death).

Zarathos becomes a threat once again when the Midnight Sons are formed. He briefly joins forces with the demon mother Lilith (not to be confused with the daughter of Dracula, who has the same name), but soon leaves her after he realized she was just using him to bring her the Medallion of Power. Another reason he left her was because she duped him into joining her forces (his memory was so bad at the time that Lilith actually convinced him that he was her son). After he left, he went to become the leader of the Fallen, the evil Blood (his acolytes) once again. Having lost his memory, Zarathos has not quite reached his full power until he meets the Fallen. After that, he gains enough power to defeat the Ghost Rider and absorb his essence. However, he suffers horrible agony since the Ghost Rider was still residing within him. This gives the Midnight Sons a chance to defeat Zarathos. It is Blade who takes Foundry's sword, killing her with it so he can use her blood-stained sword to defeat Zarathos. Blade defeats Zarathos by turning him into stone; he remained that way until the Ghost Rider: Hammerlane miniseries, where he began to reconstitute himself within Johnny Blaze, after which he and Johnny made peace with one another.  After the Fear Itself story line, Blaze had Zarathos exorcised from him.  The demon Zarathos was eventually then bonded to a female host in the present series. Eventually, Zarathos was ultimately bound once again to Johnny Blaze.

Before he was turned to stone, Zarathos had claimed that he had coupled with Lilith, impregnating her. Lilith plans to unleash her children, but this is yet to be seen.

During the Damnation event Zarathos, along with Johnny Blaze, went to Hell and took Mephisto's throne, becoming the new King of Hell.

Powers and abilities
Zarathos is continuously shown to be able to challenge Mephisto in both Earthly and magical combat. He possesses immeasurable levels of strength and stamina well beyond that of his hosts and is wholly immune to anything other than the powers of beings such as the One Above All. When at full strength, Zarathos has exhibited influence over certain Earthly elements; he is able to conjure thunderstorms to incinerate his opponents with bolts of lightning, as well as rupture the ground either to trap his victims in hard rock or to impale them with spiked stalagmites.

He is able to shoot hellfire from his hands, and can transport both himself and others to different locations. Apparently, the more souls he consumes, the more powerful he becomes. Zarathos also has significant knowledge of magical lore and possesses the ability to manipulate magical energies for a variety of effects.

References

External links
 
 Zarathos at Marvel Wiki

Characters created by Gary Friedrich
Characters created by Mike Ploog
Characters created by Roy Thomas
Comics characters introduced in 1972
Fictional characters with fire or heat abilities
Fictional characters with spirit possession or body swapping abilities
Fictional demons and devils
Fictional skeletons
Marvel Comics characters who use magic
Marvel Comics characters with superhuman strength
Marvel Comics devils
Marvel Comics supervillains
Merged fictional characters
Mythology in Marvel Comics